Yazi Bolaghi may refer to:
 Yazi Bolaghi, Saqqez
 Yazi Bolaghi, Ziviyeh, Saqqez County